Jake Reed may refer to:

Jake Reed (American football) (born 1967), American football player
Jake Reed (baseball) (born 1992), American baseball player
Jake Reed (cricketer) (born 1990), Australian cricketer
Jake Reed (footballer) (born 1991), English footballer